The 1971 Cleveland Browns season was the team's 22nd season with the National Football League.

After missing the playoffs the previous year, the Browns got off to a good start at 4–1 only to stumble losing 4 straight to fall to 4–5. However, the Browns would rebound to win the final 5 games of the season for the AFC Central Division title. Just as the 1967 Browns returned to the playoffs following a one-year absence, so, too, did the '71 club, which was in its first season under new head coach Nick Skorich after Blanton Collier's final team in 1970 had finished just 7–7, ending a string of three consecutive postseason berths.

As was the case in 1967, the '71 Browns went 9–5 and won a division crown. They captured the AFC Central for the first time, finishing three games in front of the soon-to-emerge Pittsburgh Steelers (6–8). In the playoffs the Browns would fall in the first round 20–3 to the Baltimore Colts. Running back Leroy Kelly was on the downside of his Pro Football Hall of Fame career, but he did manage to rush for 865 yards and 10 touchdowns – still good for a 14-game season. Wide receiver Fair Hooker led the team in receptions with 45.

Offseason

Draft

Staff

Roster

Exhibition schedule 

There was a doubleheader on September 4, 1971 Jets vs Steelers and Giants vs Browns.

Schedule

Note: Intra-division opponents are in bold text.

Game Summaries

Week 1: vs. Houston 
The Browns open the regular season by blasting the Oilers, 31-0, in Nick Skorich's first game as coach. Leroy Kelly scores the Browns' first two touchdowns on 1-yard runs, and Bill Nelsen and Mike Phipps both throw a touchdown pass. The Browns intercept five passes (two by rookie Clarence Scott) and yield just 11 first downs.

Week 2: At Baltimore 
The Browns survived a late mistake and upset the defending Super Bowl-champion Colts, 14-13 at Baltimore. After Walt Sumner intercepts a Johnny Unitas pass with five seconds left (Cleveland's fifth interception), he attempts to lateral to Scott, who never touches the ball as Baltimore's Ray Perkins recovers at the Cleveland 27. But the Colts, out of timeouts, watch theclock expire before they can get off a field-goal attempt.

Week 5: At Cincinnati 
The Browns edge the Bengals, 27-24, at Cincinnati on Bo Scott's third touchdown - a 4-yard run with 39 seconds remaining. The win improves Cleveland's record to 4-1 and drops Paul Brown's defending AFC Central-champion Bengals to 1-4. The Browns get a break when defensive end Jack Gregory recovers a fumble at the Cincinnati 10, setting up a Nelsen-to-Scott TD pass.

Week 7: vs. Atlanta

Week 10 vs. New England 
The Browns snap a four-game losing streak with a 27-7 win over the Patriots at Cleveland Stadium. Kelly rushes for 113 yards and scores two touchdowns, one on a 7-yard pass from Nelsen for the game's first score. The Browns intercept four passes by New England rookie Jim Plunkett, who has trouble adjusting on a windy day.

Week 12 vs. Cincinnati 
The Browns clinch their first AFC Central Division title with a 31-27 win over Cincinnati at Cleveland. Leroy Kelly, who surpassed the 100-yard mark for the 26th time, scores the first and last touchdowns to complement a 224-yard passing performance by Nelsen.

Postseason

Standings

References

External links 
 1971 Cleveland Browns at Pro Football Reference
 1971 Cleveland Browns Statistics at jt-sw.com
 1971 Cleveland Browns Schedule at jt-sw.com
 1971 Cleveland Browns at DatabaseFootball.com  

Cleveland
Cleveland Browns seasons
AFC Central championship seasons
Cleveland Browns